On September 20, 1984, the Shi'a Islamic militant group Hezbollah, with support and direction from the Islamic Republic of Iran, carried out a suicide car bombing targeting the U.S. embassy annex in East Beirut, Lebanon. The attack killed 24 people.

Hezbollah had also used suicide car or truck bombs in the April 1983 U.S. embassy bombing and the 1983 Beirut barracks bombings.

Bombing
In July 1984, the U.S. had relocated its embassy operations from West Beirut to the relative security of Aukar, a Christian suburb of East Beirut. When on September 20, 1984, the attacker sped his van laden with 3,000 pounds (1360 kg) of explosives toward the six-story embassy, crucial security measures had not yet been completed at the complex, including a massive steel gate. The van was heading for the entrance of the diplomatic facility, but did not get within ten yards of the building after the driver was shot by a bodyguard of the British ambassador and Lebanese embassy guards and lost control of the vehicle. The vehicle detonated at 11:44 a.m. after striking a parked van.

The explosion "ripped off the front of the embassy, shredding glass, bending steel bars and destroying cars in a nearby parking lot." The attack killed a total of 24 people (including the suicide bomber). Only two of the dead were American: Chief Warrant Officer Kenneth V. Welch of the U.S. Army and Petty Officer 1st Class Michael Ray Wagner of the U.S. Navy, who were both assigned to the U.S. Defense Attache Office in Beirut. The majority of those killed were Lebanese, "either local employees or people seeking visas". Of the injured, the U.S. Ambassador, Reginald Bartholomew, was slightly hurt, as well as the British Ambassador, David Miers, who was meeting with Bartholomew at the time of explosion.

Responsibility
The Islamic Jihad Organization (IJO) claimed responsibility for the attack in a telephone call a few hours after the explosion. The caller said, "The operation goes to prove that we will carry out our previous promise not to allow a single American to remain on Lebanese soil." The U.S. government understood that Hezbollah had carried out the attack under the cover name of IJO with the support of Iran. Through satellite reconnaissance, U.S. intelligence discovered that a mock-up of the annex had been created at the Iranian Revolutionary Guard-run Sheikh Abdullah barracks in Baalbek to practice for the attack.

Legal cases
Under the amended Foreign Sovereign Immunities Act, victims of the bombing and their families have filed cases against the Islamic Republic of Iran, holding it responsible for its role in the attack and demanding compensation.
 Estate of Doe, et al. v Republic of Iran, et al. (2013) – 58 foreign national employees and one American employee that were killed or injured in the 1983 embassy bombing and 1984 embassy annex bombing are awarded $8.4 billion. The judge ruled "that the attacks were carried out by the terrorist group Islamic Jihad, known most commonly as Hezbollah, operating with Iranian support and encouragement."
 Brewer v. Islamic Republic of Iran (2009) – Security guard Richard Brewer and his family are awarded $310 million in damages. Brewer was injured in the bombing. The judge ruled "Hezbollah received substantial funds and support from Iran via its Ministry of Information and Security and the Iranian Revolutionary Guard Corps. This court concludes that defendants provided 'material support and resources' to Hezbollah."

References

Attacks on diplomatic missions in Lebanon
1984 embassy annex bombing in Beirut
Building bombings in Lebanon
Hezbollah attacks
Islamic Shia terrorism
Improvised explosive device bombings in 1984
Islamic terrorist incidents in the 1980s
Embassy annex bombing in Beirut
Massacres of the Lebanese Civil War
Mass murder in Beirut
Massacres in 1984
September 1984 events in Asia
Suicide bombings in Beirut
Suicide bombings in the 1980s
Suicide car and truck bombings in Lebanon
Terrorist incidents in Lebanon in 1984
1984 murders in Lebanon
1984 in international relations
1980s crimes in Beirut
September 1984 crimes